Hålogaland was the northernmost of the Norwegian provinces in the medieval Norse sagas. In the early Viking Age, before Harald Fairhair, Hålogaland was a kingdom extending between the Namdalen valley in Trøndelag county and the Lyngen fjord in Troms og Finnmark county.

Etymology and history
Ancient Norwegians said that  was named after a royal named Hölgi. The meaning of the demonym  is unknown. Thorstein Vikingson's Saga, 1, describes it as a compound of Hial, "Hel" or "spirit," and "loge", "fire" - although this is largely discredited.

The Gothic historian Jordanes in his work  (also known as Getica), written in Constantinople , mentions a people "Adogit" living in the far North. This is also largely discredited.

A fanciful and legendary interpretation is found in the medieval accounts of Ynglingatal and Skáldskaparmál, "Logi" is described as the personification of fire, a fire giant, and as a "son of Fornjót". The royal lineages sprung from his children are discussed in these and other medieval accounts. Derived from that name his country became called , meaning "Hálogi's land". Eventually the spelling of the name shaped to the modern-day Hålogaland.

A more realistic interpretation of the name is presented by Halvdan Koht and Alfred Jacobsen (in Håløyminne 1, 1920): 'Háleygr' is derived from Proto-Scandinavian *HaÞulaikaR, with the elements *haÞu 'battle' and *laik- 'pledge'. In other words, a wartime alliance of the many settlements in times of conflict.

The Hversu Noregr byggðist is a legendary account of the origin of various legendary Norwegian lineages. It traces the descendants of the primeval ruler Fornjót (Fornjotr) down to Nór, who is here the eponym and first great king of Norway, who unites the Norwegian lands (petty kingdoms). The Hversu account is closely paralleled by the opening of the Orkneyinga saga.

In 873 AD, according to the Egil's saga (written ) the Kvens and Norse cooperate in battling against the invading Karelians. The chapter XVII of Egil's saga describes how Thorolf Kveldulfsson (King of Norway's tax chief starting 872 AD) from Namdalen, located in the southernmost tip of the historic Hålogaland, goes toKvenland again:

Based on medieval documents, the above meeting took place during the winter of 873–874. Hålogaland's rather close vicinity to Kvenland is also demonstrated  in the geographical chronicle  by the Icelandic Abbot Níkulás Bergsson (Nikolaos), who provides descriptions of lands around Norway:

As recorded in Hákonar saga Hákonarsonar, King Hákon Hákonarson settled some of the people of Bjarmaland in Malangen near modern Tromsø in the 1230s or 40s. According to Saxo Grammaticus in his Gesta Danorum, King Helgi of Hålogaland married a Princess Thora of Lappland and Bjarmaland, daughter of Prince Gusi, but in other sources he is only given as King of Lappland. In any event, for centuries the Norwegians of Hålogaland had extensive relations with both the Bjarmar  and Saami, and to some extent also the Kvens.

Modern usage
In modern times, the term Hålogaland is used in a variety of senses. For some purposes, all of Northern Norway plus Svalbard and Jan Mayen are covered under the term Hålogaland. For other purposes the counties of Nordland and Troms constitute Hålogaland. Hålogaland or even Mid Hålogaland are frequent terms covering the smaller districts of Ofoten, Lofoten and Vesterålen, as well as the municipalities Bjarkøy, Gratangen, Harstad, Ibestad, Kvæfjord and Skånland of Troms og Finnmark county. The term has also been used in this last sense, minus the Lofoten archipelago.

The name is currently used by the Dioceses of Nord-Hålogaland, Sør-Hålogaland, as well as by a Court of Appeal, a theater and a large bridge.

A derived name is Helgeland which refers to southern Nordland.

History

It was inhabited by the race of Hölgi who was the eponymous hero of Hålogaland.

In the saga, Heimskringla, a man called Gudlög led a number of Norwegian pirates that were fought by the Swedish king Jorund and king Godgest of Hålogaland was given a horse by the Swedish king Adils. The first earl of Lade, Håkon Grjotgardsson, ruler of Trøndelag, came from Hålogaland, and sought to extend his kingdom southwards. Here, he met with Harald Fairhair, and joined him.

Archaeologists have uncovered the Chieftain House at Borg in Lofoten, a large Viking Era building believed to have been already established around the year 500. Archaeological studies commenced here in 1983 and in 1986–89, a joint Scandinavian research project was conducted at Borg. Excavations brought to light remains of the largest building ever to be found from the Viking Era in Norway, 83 meters long and 9 meters high. The chieftain's seat at Borg is estimated to have been abandoned around AD 950. Today the site is the location of the Lofotr Viking Museum.

Geography
Hålogaland is a drowned coastline containing extensive mountainous fjords and islands. It was an excellent refuge for Viking ships as well as a way station for voyagers to the White Sea, which offered access to Russia. Even in modern times, Narvik was an important World War II objective. In 2008, the name was proposed as the possible name of an independent Northern Norway.

See also
Þorgerðr Hölgabrúðr - Goddess strongly associated with Hölgi
Gunnhild, Mother of Kings - given as from Hålogaland and a daughter of Ozur Toti in Heimskringla and Egil's saga
Ottar from Hålogaland - Viking adventurer from Hålogaland
Thorir Hund - Great chief in Hålogaland
Earls of Lade - claimed to be his descendants
Hrafnistumannasögur
Ketils saga hœngs - Legendary saga about chieftain Kettil Trout from Hrafnista (Ramsta, Nærøy) in Hålogaland
Gríms saga loðinkinna - its sequel
Örvar-Odd's saga - their sequel
Egill Skallagrímsson - hero of Egil's saga  and Icelandic descendant of the Hrafnista family
Hrafn Haengsson - important Icelandic lawspeaker, also a descendant and thus cousin of Egill's
Hårek of Tjøtta - contemporary of Thorir Hund and relation of the Norwegian Crown
Battle of Stiklestad
Hálfdanar saga Eysteinssonar - descendants of King Sæming of Hålogaland through King Thrand of Trondheim

References

Other sources

 Berglund, Birgitta (1994) Helgeland historie (Mosjøen) 
Bertelsen, Reidar (1985) Lofoten og Vesteralens historie: Fra den eldste tida til ca. 1500 e (Kommunene i Lofoten og Vesteralen)

External links 
 Lofotr Viking Museum
 Mystikkens Land Lofoten
Lofotr

Districts of Trøndelag
Districts of Nordland
Districts of Troms og Finnmark
Saga locations
Petty kingdoms of Norway